Tourism is an important economic sector for many countries in Africa. There are many countries that benefit heavily from tourism like Uganda, Algeria, Egypt, South Africa, Kenya, Morocco, Tunisia, Ghana and Tanzania. The touristic particularity of Africa lies in the wide variety of points of interest, diversity and multitudes of landscapes as well as the rich cultural heritage. Also, an ecotourist industry is present in some African countries (i.e. South Africa, Kenya, Namibia, Rwanda, Zambia, Uganda, Mozambique, etc.).

Overview
Countries in Africa started investing in their tourism markets since the late 1960s and 1970s and are at different levels of tourism development.Countries in the continent of Africa are typically categorized using Butler's 1980 Tourist Area Life Cycle (TALC) model which is a common model that describes six specific stages of tourism development for all countries worldwide: exploration, involvement, development, consolidation and stagnation. 

However, a World Bank study in 2011 classified also African countries in to 4 categories based on performance.These performance groupings were based on indicators such business environment; tourism regulation, infrastructure, resources, tourism income, number of visitors and the potential growth of the market.

“pre-emergent”: Somalia, Sudan, Eritrea, Comoros, Togo, Guinea, Chad, Guinea Bissau, Niger, Central African Rep., Congo D.R., Liberia, Somalia, Sudan, Congo, Rep., Equatorial Guinea
“potential”: Madagascar, Ethiopia, and Gabon, Mauritania, Mali, Ethiopia, Madagascar, Benin, São Tomé and Príncipe, Sierra Leone, Burundi, Côte d’Ivoire, Nigeria, Lesotho, Angola, Swaziland,Cameroon, and Gabon 
“emerging”: Rwanda and the Seychelles, Zambia, Uganda, Rwanda, The Gambia, Senegal, Zimbabwe, Burkina Faso, Malawi, and Mozambique, Seycehlles 
“consolidating”: Morocco, South Africa, Mauritius, Tanzania, Kenya, Cape Verde, Ghana, Namibia, Botswana tourism destinations.

Tourism Sectors

Ecotourism

Ecotourism is the concept of responsible trips and travel to areas that might be protected and especially fragile. The intent is to create as little detrimental impact on the environment as possible. In some locations (such as Gorongosa National Park) where the wildlife has previously been decimated, rewilding has been done and much of the wildlife has been brought back (along with vegetation, thus allowing the environment to sequester more carbon then what was previously the case). This return of wildlife has created tourism opportunities (wildlife viewing, safari trips) allowing to bring in financial revenue. It also requires personnel such as park rangers, to be present, thus creating local employment opportunities.Historical Sites and MonumentsAfrica has a great historical architectural structures that survived over several years from ancient civilizations and other structures that are more recent. Ancient historical sites include the Pyramids and temples in both Egypt and Sudan; The Obelisk of Axum from Ethiopia; the ruins of ancient Zimbabwe's trading city, Great Zimbabwe; and the Palace of Emperor Fasilides in Ethiopia. https://www.nationalgeographic.com/travel/article/sudan-archaeology-pyramdis-kush-nubia  https://whc.unesco.org/en/news/116 https://whc.unesco.org/en/list/364/https://www.tuko.co.ke/facts-lifehacks/463019-15-famous-buildings-africa-showcase-continents-iconic-architecture/
More recent structures that attract tourism includes the old slave castles in Ghana, Elmina Castle and Cape Coast Castle, which are also sited for heritage tourism. It also includes the highest monument in the world, the African Renaissance Monument in Senegal.

Medical Tourism 

Due to advance in technologies, techniques and best practices and lower costs, Africa has experienced a surge in medical tourism and health tourism. Countries that are destinations for medical and health tourism packages include Algeria, Ghana, Ivory Coast, Kenya, Mauritius, Morocco, Nigeria, Rwanda, South Africa, Tanzania and Tunisia. The top destinations for European visitors include Egypt, Tunisia, and South Africa. South Africa is the top destination for both international tourists and regional tourists from other African countries.

Tea Tourism 

African has a rich history of tea cultivation which is giving rise to several countries having a growing tea tourism destinations. Malawi was the first country to grow tea in Africa and has many tea estates that are decades ole. Countries like Morocco, Kenya, Malawi, South Africa are large tea-producing countries which are frequented by tea tourists. South Africa's tea tourism market is focused on rooibos tea.

Tourism by arrivals
All of the data presented here is from the World Tourism Organization (UNWTO) and from "Reviewing Africa in the Global Tourism Economy." 
The following table shows the number of arrivals in each country:

Tourism by receipts
The following map and data depict the income from tourism in US dollar equivalent:

Notes

See also
Africa-EU partnership: sustainable growth and jobs
Climate change in Africa
Climate change adaptation
Eco hotel
ECOWAS ECOTOUR
Ecosystem restoration
European Tourism Manifesto
UN Decade on Ecosystem Restoration
Safari lodge

References

External links

 South Africa Tours - Official travel operator in Australia, New Zealand and the United Kingdom.